Meghdol is an indie rock band from Bangladesh, known for its poetic urban-themed lyrics and theatrical musical arrangement. Founded in 2003, the band has released two studio albums.

History
Meghdol was formed in 2003 by Shibu Kumer Shil, Mejbaur Rahman Sumon, Rasheed Sharif Shoaib and Masud hasan Ujjal, while they were studying Fine Arts at University of Dhaka. The band's name was inspired by the Charles Baudelaire poem L'Étranger. The band released their eponymous album Meghdol, subtitled Droher Montre Bhalobasha, in 2004.The second album Shohorbondi came out in 2009, after which the band went on a nine-year hiatus.

Meghdol returned to the music scene in 2018 through the YouTube release of Esho amar shohore, a track from their planned third album Aluminium-er Dana. In October, 2020, the band released a re-mastered version of their debut album Droher Montre Bhalobasha. In November 2021, the band was sued for allegedly hurting religious feelings by sampling a Muslim prayer chant in the song Om, featured in the remastered album, although the charges were withdrawn a week later. In July 2022, Meghdol released E Hawa, the fifth track of the album Aluminium-er Dana as a tribute to the feature film Hawa, directed by Sumon, one of the band's founding members. The band's lead guitarist Shoaib, despite his 2020 announcement to leave the band, played lead guitar on this track and participated in the subsequent tours and concerts to promote the movie.

Discography
 Meghdol - Droher Montre Bhalobasha (2004)
 Shohorbondi (2009)
 Neon Aloy Shwagotom (mixed album) (2007)

References

Musical groups established in 2003
2003 establishments in Bangladesh
Bangladeshi alternative rock groups
Bangladeshi heavy metal musical groups